The Men's 3000 metres steeplechase event at the 2003 Summer Universiade was held on 29 August in Daegu, South Korea.

Results

References
Results

Athletics at the 2003 Summer Universiade
2003